Phallobata is a genus of fungi in the family Trappeaceae. The genus is monotypic, containing the single truffle-like species Phallobata alba, found in Australia.

References

Hysterangiales
Fungi of Australia
Monotypic Basidiomycota genera
Truffles (fungi)